Clown Kill (originally released as Lock In), is a 2014 British slasher film written and directed by Mark J. Howard, produced by Howard and Stephen Greenhalgh, and starring Jessica Cunningham.

Plot

Jenny, an ambitious, feisty advertising executive was kidnapped by a clown after having her drink spiked in a bar, and is raped by a clown. After taking six months off work, she comes back to work again when she decides to spend the night in the office block due to a deadline to meet when she is terrorised by the same clown who raped her six months ago.

Production
The film received mainstream attention after its star Jessica Cunningham participated in The Apprentice in late 2016. The media expressed incredulity that Cunningham had been involved in the film.

Cunningham was six months pregnant when she filmed scenes of being raped, as well as a shower scene in which she appears nude. She additionally had to perform scenes in which she is tied up and has her mouth gagged.

Reception

The film has received mixed reviews.

References

External links

2014 films
2014 horror films
British horror films
British slasher films
Horror films about clowns
2010s English-language films
2010s British films